Aspergillus nakazawae (also named A. pallidofulvus) is a species of fungus in the genus Aspergillus. It is from the Circumdati section. The species was first described in 1950. It has been reported to produce aspergamide A, aspergamide B, notoamides, penicillic acid, mellein, 4-hydroxy mellein, xanthomegnin, viomellein, aspyrone, and neoaspergillic acid.

Growth and morphology

A. nakazawae has been cultivated on both Czapek yeast extract agar (CYA) plates and Malt Extract Agar Oxoid® (MEAOX) plates. The growth morphology of the colonies can be seen in the pictures below.

References 

nakazawae
Fungi described in 1950